Dieuphène Thélamour (born 17 July 1979) is a retired Haitian football striker.

References

1979 births
Living people
Haitian footballers
Haiti international footballers
Racing CH players
Happy Valley AA players
Association football forwards
Haitian expatriate footballers
Expatriate footballers in Hong Kong